Montcornet is a commune in the Aisne department in Hauts-de-France in northern France.

Battle of Montcornet

On 14 May 1940, Charles de Gaulle was given command of the new 4e Division cuirassée and ordered to execute a counterattack toward Montcornet, with the objective of slowing the German advance. This was one of the only counterattacks of the French campaign that succeeded in repulsing the German troops.

Population

See also
Communes of the Aisne department

References

Communes of Aisne
Aisne communes articles needing translation from French Wikipedia